Stars on 33 was the first DJ mix album mixed by Aim. The album was released in 2002 on the Fat City Recordings label.

Track listing
"It's a Sin to Go Away" – We All Together
"The F Word" (RJD2 Remix) – Cannibal Ox
"Wasting Time" – Fingathing
"Cross My Palm She Whispered" – Cherrystones
"I Walk the Earth" – King Biscuit Time
"Ooh Lawd" – Jazzy Grooves
"Boss on the Boat" – Tosca
"Interlude 12" – Sidewinder
"Chocolates and Cheese" – Jon Kennedy
"Cock'd Back" – K Terrorbul
"Cold Water Music" (Deadbeats Remix) – Aim
"Phantasm" – Aim
"Never My Love" – Tom Scott

Aim (musician) albums
DJ mix albums
2002 compilation albums